Compsaraia samueli is a species of apteronotid electric fish that exhibits pronounced sexual dimorphism in which mature males develop extremely elongated snouts and oral jaws.  This phenotype is found in several other apteronotid species and is used in agonistic jaw-locking behaviors between males.
A study comparing skull shape and jaw-closing performance in males and females of Compsaraia samueli suggested that males with elongated faces for use in fights also had lower mechanical advantages, indicating a trade-off between sexual weaponry and jaw leverage.

Named in honor of the senior author’s father, Samuel Albert, who accompanied his son on an electric-fish collecting trip to Peru, and purchased type specimens from a fish market near Iquitos when he recognized that they differed from all the other electric fishes they had been collecting by the prominent elongate jaws of mature males.

References

Taxa named by James S. Albert
Taxa named by William Gareth Richard Crampton
Fish described in 2009
Weakly electric fish
Apteronotidae